Khvosh Ab (also Romanized as Khvosh Āb, Khowshāb, and Khūshāb) is a village in Nujin Rural District, in the Central District of Farashband County, Fars Province, Iran. At the 2006 census, its population was 473, in 122 families.

References 

Populated places in Farashband County